The Uruguay Naval Academy (ESNAL) is a training institute that educates officers for commissioning primarily into the Uruguayan National Navy. It is located at Calle Miramar 1643, Barrio Carrrasco, Montevideo.

Initially, Navy officers trained at the Military School (dependent on the National Army of Uruguay) until December 12, 1907, the Naval Academy was founded.

It is the only institute in the country that grants the title of Officer of the National Navy or Merchant Navy, graduating as Midshipmen and as Second Officers for each career, respectively; Training and certification courses are also held for seafarers, according to the regulations of the International Maritime Organization (IMO).  In the Naval Academy, fifth and sixth secondary education, the Naval Baccalaureate, can be taken as undergraduate education.

Education system

Secondary education 
The "Bachillerato Naval" (Liceo No. 98 in Montevideo), offers the option of pursuing two years of specialization (2nd and 3rd Year of Baccalaureate) into Humanities or Science.

Military education and training

Officer of the National Navy 
The curriculum consists of four years in boarding school, being able to choose to specialize in the General Corps, the Coast Guard Corps or the Machine and Electricity Engineer Corps. The Officers who approve a thesis obtain the title of Bachelor of Naval Systems.

Merchant Marine Officer 
The curriculum consists of four years in an external regime, having the option of specializing as a Merchant Pilot or Merchant Engineer. Graduates who pass a thesis obtain the Bachelor of Nautical Systems.

References 

Military academies of Uruguay
Montevideo
1907 establishments in Uruguay
Buildings and structures in Montevideo
Educational institutions established in 1907
Naval academies
Universities in Uruguay
National Navy of Uruguay